The Artaxi Formation, also rendered A’ertaxi, is located in the Xinjiang Uygur Autonomous Region and is dated to the Early Devonian period.

References

Devonian System of Asia
Geology of Xinjiang
Geologic formations of China